Young Vienna (Jung-Wien) was a society of fin de siècle writers who met in Vienna's Café Griensteidl and other nearby coffeehouses in the late nineteenth century.

The group turned away from the prevailing Naturalism of the time and experimented with various facets of Modernism, including Symbolism and Impressionism.  In his review of turn of the century Vienna, historian Carl Schorske wrote of the movement that they "challenged the moralistic stance of nineteenth century literature in favor of sociological truth and psychological - especially sexual - openness."

Hermann Bahr was considered the group's spokesman. Other members included Arthur Schnitzler, Peter Altenberg,  Richard Beer-Hofmann, Felix Salten, Raoul Auernheimer,  Hugo von Hofmannsthal, and Karl Kraus.  Kraus would later distance himself from the group, and in his essay "The Demolished Literature," written soon after the Café Griensteidl's demolition in 1897, he criticized the group and predicted that it "would soon expire for lack of a foyer."  After the café's demolition the group (sans Kraus) continued to meet at the nearby Café Central.

Stefan Zweig, in his book The World of Yesterday, eulogized Vienna's fin de siècle coffeehouse culture, where for "the small price of a cup of coffee," a youth who aspired to intellectuality could "sit for hours on end, discuss, write, play cards, receive his mail, and, above all, [could] go through an unlimited number of newspapers and magazines" in search of news about literary, artistic, or philosophical happenings with which, good-naturedly, to show up his peers:[I]n our constant childish, boastful, and almost sporting ambition we wished to outdo each other in our knowledge of the very latest thing, we found ourselves actually in a sort of constant rivalry for the sensational. If, for example, we discussed Nietzsche, who then was still scorned, one of us would suddenly say with feigned superiority, “But in the idea of egotism Kierkegaard is superior to him,” and at once we became uneasy: Who is Kierkegaard, whom X knows and of whom we know nothing?” The next day we stormed into the library to look up the books of this time-obscured Danish philosopher, for it was a mark of inferiority not to know some exotic thing that was familiar to someone else. We had a passion to be the first to discover the latest, the newest, the most extravagant, the unusual, which had not yet been dwelt upon at length, particularly by the official literary critics of our daily papers.

Members or environment of the group 
 , né Richard Engländer (1859, Vienna1919, Vienna), writer and poet
 , né Leopold Freiherr Ferdinand  (1875, Berlin1951, Fribourg), diplomat and writer
  (1876, Vienna1948, Oakland), jurist and writer
  (1863, Linz1934, Munich), writer, dramatist and critic
  (1866, Vienna1945, New York), Romancier, dramatist and lyric poet
  (1859, Mährisch Weißkirchen1906, Vienna), journalist and writer
 ,  né Felix Biedermann (1870, Vienna1928, Vienna), writer, librettist and filmproducer
 Frida Uhl Strindberg (1872, Mondsee1943), writer and translator
  (1865, Breslau1935, Vienna), journalist, publicist, travel writer, theatre critic and translator
  (1874, Vienna1929, Rodaun), writer, dramatist, lyric poet and librettist
  (1874, Jitschin1936, Vienna), publicist, satirist, lyric poet, aphorist, dramatist and critic
  (1874, Lemberg1928, Wandsbek), lyric poet, narrative writer, critic and translator
 ,  né Siegmund Salzmann (1869, Pest1945), author and critic
  (1862, Leopoldstadt1931, Vienna), narrative writer and dramatist
  (1870, Vienna1932), lyricist, dramatist, musicologist and writer
  (1873, Fürth1934, Altaussee), writer
  (1881, Vienna1942, Petrópolis), writer

References

External links 
 German-language article in the Österreich Lexicon
 Literary Encyclopedia article on Karl Kraus

 
Literary modernism
Literary movements
Fin de siècle